Valentin Prokopov  (June 10, 1929 – before 2016) was a Russian water polo player who competed for the Soviet Union in the 1952 Summer Olympics and in the 1956 Summer Olympics. He became notorious for striking Hungarian player Ervin Zádor in the Blood in the Water match.

In 1952 he was part of the Soviet team which finished seventh in the Olympic water polo tournament. He played all nine matches and scored at least two goals (not all scorers are known). Four years later he won the bronze medal with the Soviet team in the 1956 tournament. He played six matches without scoring a goal.

See also
 List of Olympic medalists in water polo (men)

References

External links
 

1929 births
Year of death missing
Russian male water polo players
Soviet male water polo players
Olympic water polo players of the Soviet Union
Water polo players at the 1952 Summer Olympics
Water polo players at the 1956 Summer Olympics
Olympic bronze medalists for the Soviet Union
Olympic medalists in water polo
Medalists at the 1956 Summer Olympics